CJEB-FM is a French-language radio station located in Trois-Rivières, Quebec, Canada.

Owned and operated by Cogeco, it broadcasts on 100.1 MHz using a directional antenna with an average effective radiated power of 43,050 watts and a peak effective radiated power of 81,100 watts (class C1).

The station has an adult contemporary format since it opened in June 2004 and is part of the Rythme FM network which operates across much of Quebec.

References

External links
100.1 Rythme FM
 

Jeb
Jeb
Jeb
Jeb
Radio stations established in 2004
2004 establishments in Quebec